This article show all participating team squads at the 2008 FIVB Women's Volleyball World Grand Prix, played by twelve countries with the final round held in Yokohama Arena, Yokohama, Japan.

Head Coach: José Roberto Guimarães

Head Coach: Chen Zhonghe

Head Coach: Antonio Perdomo

Head Coach: Marcos Kwiek

Head Coach: Giovanni Guidetti

Head Coach: Massimo Barbolini

Head Coach: Shoichi Yanagimoto

Head Coach: Viktor Zhuravlev

Head Coach: Marco Bonitta

Head Coach: Nataphon Srisamutnak

Head Coach: Alessandro Chiappini

Head Coach: Lang Ping

References
FIVB

2008
2008 in volleyball